Rawhead Rex may refer to:

 "Rawhead Rex", a short story in Volume Three of Clive Barker's Books of Blood
Rawhead Rex (film), a 1986 horror film adapted from the story